Canagasabai Kunalan (born 23 October 1942), known as C. Kunalan, is a retired Singaporean sprinter, relay runner, former footballer and educator, widely regarded as one of Singapore's greatest ever athletes. Named Sportsman of the Year in both 1968 and 1969, his feat of 10.38 seconds in the 1968 Mexico City Olympic Games 100 metres was a national record that stood for 33 years.

Career

Runner
Kunalan first came into running in 1963, at the age of 20. Formerly a football player, Kunalan switched to running when his PE teacher commended him for his fast-moving legs after noticing him running while chasing the ball. He participated in the 1964 Summer Olympics as part of the Malaysian 4 × 100 m relay team with Malaysian sprint legend Mani Jegathesan, and subsequently represented Singapore after it left the federation.

Kunalan has participated in two Olympic Games (Tokyo, 1964 and Mexico City, 1968) and has earned five Asian Games and fifteen Southeast Asian Peninsular Games medals.

He had to retire in 1979 due to a heel injury.

Educator
C Kunalan taught six years in Tiong Bahru Primary School and thirteen years in Dunearn Secondary Technical School before joining the National Institute of Education in 1980. Kunalan became an assistant professor there. He specialised in functional anatomy and exercise physiology, and conducted practical classes in fitness and conditioning. Kunalan left the institute in 2010.

He was awarded the Meritorious Service Medal in 2015 as part of the National Day Awards.

Singapore Athletic Association
He also serves as Vice Principal (Training and Selection) with the Singapore Athletic Association.

SYOGOC
Kunalan was one of the 23 members of the Singapore Youth Olympic Games Organising Committee (SYOGOC).

References

Further reading

External links
 

 
 
 
 

1942 births
Living people
Singaporean male sprinters
Olympic athletes of Singapore
Olympic athletes of Malaysia
Singaporean people of Tamil descent
Singaporean people of Indian descent
Athletes (track and field) at the 1964 Summer Olympics
Athletes (track and field) at the 1968 Summer Olympics
Commonwealth Games competitors for Singapore
Athletes (track and field) at the 1966 British Empire and Commonwealth Games
Athletes (track and field) at the 1970 British Commonwealth Games
People from Singapore
Asian Games medalists in athletics (track and field)
Athletes (track and field) at the 1966 Asian Games
Athletes (track and field) at the 1970 Asian Games
Athletes (track and field) at the 1974 Asian Games
Asian Games silver medalists for Singapore
Asian Games bronze medalists for Singapore
Southeast Asian Games medalists in athletics
Southeast Asian Games silver medalists for Singapore
Southeast Asian Games bronze medalists for Singapore
Recipients of the Pingat Jasa Gemilang
Medalists at the 1966 Asian Games
Medalists at the 1970 Asian Games
Medalists at the 1974 Asian Games
Competitors at the 1977 Southeast Asian Games